Sougeta is a small town in central Guinea.

Transport 

It is served by a station of the Guinea Railways networks.

See also 

 Railway stations in Guinea

References 

Populated places in Guinea